Christian Mithassel (born 29 September 1987) is a Norwegian freestyle skier. He was born in Oslo. He competed in ski cross at the World Ski Championships 2013, and at the 2014 Winter Olympics in Sochi, in ski-cross.

References

External links

1987 births
Living people
Skiers from Oslo
Freestyle skiers at the 2014 Winter Olympics
Norwegian male freestyle skiers
Olympic freestyle skiers of Norway